En el gran circo is a 1974 Argentine film.

Cast
  Ismael Echeverría …Rufino Mangiapane
  Laura Bove …Alicia
  Víctor Hugo Vieyra …Aníbal
  Dolores De Cicco
  Nelly Beltrán …Encarnación, madrina
  Maurice Jouvet …Molina
  Pepita Muñoz
  Marcelo José
  Ovidio Fuentes …Pedro Antúnez, chofer
  Víctor Fassari
  Ernesto Juliano

External links
 

1974 films
Argentine comedy films
1970s Spanish-language films
1970s Argentine films